Ernest Herbert Coleman (19 October 1889 – 15 June 1958) was an English footballer, notable for making an appearance in 1921 with the English national side despite playing for non-league Dulwich Hamlet.

References

External links
Player profile at EnglandStats.com
Player profile at the FA

1889 births
1958 deaths
English footballers
England international footballers
Dulwich Hamlet F.C. players
Association football goalkeepers